This is a list of members of the South Australian House of Assembly from 1906 to 1910, as elected at the 1906 state election:

 Adelaide MHA James Zimri Sellar died on 20 December 1906. Reginald Blundell won the resulting by-election on 26 January 1907.
 Stanley MHA William Patrick Cummins died on 9 March 1907. Kossuth William Duncan won the resulting by-election on 13 April.
 Flinders MHA Arthur Hugh Inkster died on 29 March 1907. Edgar Hampton Warren won the resulting by-election on 18 May.
 Adelaide MHA Ernest Roberts resigned on 15 May 1908. Edward Alfred Anstey won the resulting by-election on 20 June.
 Northern Territory MHA Vaiben Louis Solomon died on 20 October 1908. Thomas Crush won the resulting by-election on 5 December.
 Wooroora MHA Friedrich Wilhelm Paech died on 29 December 1908. Frederick William Young won the resulting by-election on 13 February 1909.
 Torrens MHA Thomas Price died on 31 May 1909. Thomas Ryan won the resulting by-election on 3 July.
 Northern Territory MHA Samuel James Mitchell resigned on 18 January 1910. No by-election was held before the 1910 election.

References

External links
History of South Australian elections 1857–2006, volume 1: ECSA

Members of South Australian parliaments by term
20th-century Australian politicians